Marisa Howard ( Marisa Vander Malle, born August 10, 1992) is an American athlete who specializes in the 3000 metres steeplechase. In 2019, she won the silver medal in the women's 3000 metres steeplechase at the 2019 Pan American Games held in Lima, Peru.

References

External links 
 

Living people
1992 births
Place of birth missing (living people)
American female steeplechase runners
Athletes (track and field) at the 2019 Pan American Games
Medalists at the 2019 Pan American Games
Pan American Games silver medalists for the United States
Pan American Games medalists in athletics (track and field)
Pan American Games track and field athletes for the United States
21st-century American women